The Airport Line (formerly the R1 Airport) is a route of the SEPTA Regional Rail commuter rail system in Philadelphia, Pennsylvania, which officially runs between Philadelphia International Airport through Center City to Temple University station. In practice, however, only a few trains originate or terminate at Temple University; most are through routed with lines to the north after leaving the Center City Commuter Connection. Half of weekday trains are through routed with the Warminster Line, with the other half of weekday trains through routed with the Fox Chase Line. All weekend and holiday trains are through routed with the Warminster Line and terminate either in Warminster or Glenside.

The line between Center City and the airport runs seven days a week from 5:00 am to midnight with trains every 30 minutes on weekdays and every hour on weekends and holidays. The trip length from Suburban Station to the airport is 19 to 24 minutes. The line is fully grade-separated in the normal service, but one public grade crossing between Temple University and Glenside is present at Rices Mill Road in Glenside.

Route

While geographically on the former Pennsylvania Railroad side of the Regional Rail System, the route consists of new construction, a reconstructed industrial branch of the former Pennsylvania Railroad, and a shared Conrail (formerly Reading Company) freight branch. The Airport Line opened on April 28, 1985, as SEPTA R1, providing service from Center City to Philadelphia International Airport. By its twentieth anniversary in 2005, the line had carried over 20 million passengers to and from the airport. The line splits from Amtrak's Northeast Corridor north of Darby and passes over it via a flying junction. West of the airport, the line breaks from the old right-of-way and a new bridge carries it over I-95 and into the airport terminals between the baggage claim (arrivals) and the check-in counters (departures).

The line stops at four stations which are directly connected to each airport terminal by escalators and elevators which rise one level to the walkways between the arrival and departure areas. All airport stations feature high-level platforms to make it easier to board and alight from the train with luggage. Some stations can be accessed directly from the arrivals concourse by crossing Commercial Vehicles Road. The line ends between Terminals E and F at their combined station.

, most weekday Airport Line trains are through routed with the Warminster Line and the Fox Chase Line and alternate between terminating in Warminster and Fox Chase respectively. Most weekend trains are through routed with the Warminster Line and alternate between terminating in Glenside and Warminster.

Stations
 
The Airport Line makes the following station stops, after leaving the Center City Commuter Connection.

History

The line south of the Northeast Corridor was originally part of the Philadelphia, Wilmington and Baltimore Railroad main line, opened on January 17, 1838. The connection between the NEC and the original PW&B is made however by the later 60th Street Branch. A new alignment of the PW&B (now the NEC) opened November 18, 1872, and on July 1, 1873, the Philadelphia and Reading Railway, later the Reading Company, leased the old line for 999 years. Connection was made over the PRR's Junction Railroad and later the Baltimore and Ohio Railroad's Baltimore and Philadelphia Railroad. However, as a condition of the sale, no passenger service was provided. The line passed into Conrail in 1976 and SEPTA in 1983, with passenger service to the Philadelphia International Airport beginning on April 28, 1985.

Infill stations were planned from the beginning of service, two of which were on the Airport Line proper: one at 70th Street, the other one at 84th Street. The latter station was opened in 1997 as Eastwick, while 70th Street was never built, and has since disappeared from maps. Additionally, University City station (proposed as "Civic Center", now Penn Medicine station) opened in April 1995 to serve all R1, R2 and R3 trains passing it. All these stations appeared on 1984 SEPTA informational maps, the first ones to show the Center City Commuter Connection and the Airport Line.

SEPTA activated positive train control on the Airport Line on October 10, 2016.

Ridership
Between FY 2008-FY 2019 annual ridership on the Airport Line peaked at 2,457,743 during FY 2015, but fell to 1,518,250 by FY 2019.

Notes

References

External links

Airport Line | SEPTA

 
SEPTA Regional Rail
Airport rail links in the United States
Reading Company lines
Philadelphia, Baltimore and Washington Railroad lines
Railway lines opened in 1985
Philadelphia International Airport
1985 establishments in Pennsylvania